Enceliopsis argophylla, commonly known as the silverleaf sunray, is a North American species of flowering plant in the family Asteraceae. Other common names include nakedstem sunray and naked-stemmed daisy. It is native to the southwestern United States: Arizona (Mohave County), Nevada (Clark County), and Utah (Washington County), and can be seen a short distance east of Las Vegas, Nevada.

Description
Appearing in April and May, the flower heads are yellow, at the ends of long peduncles, each head with as many as 35 ray florets and up to 500 tiny disc florets. The achene is strongly flattened, covered with small hairs, and sometimes with a pappus of 2 awns up to 2 mm long (unlike some of the related species).

American botanist Daniel Cady Eaton described the silverleaf sunray as Tithonia argophylla in 1871.

Distribution and habitat
Found in Clark and Mohave Counties in the vicinity of the artificial reservoir Lake Mead, it grows on stony barren slopes at  altitude. It often grows alongside the rare golden bear-claw poppy or Las Vegas bear-poppy Arctomecon californica. Both plants grow in a fragile gypsum crust on the soil, which when damaged facilitates the spread of invasive plants. Its habitat is threatened by the reservoir as well as off-road recreational vehicle use.

References

External links
Nevada Natural Heritage Program
Bird and Hike, Perennial Forbs Around Las Vegas, Vegetation Around Las Vegas, Silverleaf Sunray (Enceliopsis argophylla) photos, description, ecological information
Lady Bird Johnson Wildflower Center, University of Texas

argophylla
Flora of Arizona
Flora of Nevada
Flora of Utah
Natural history of the Mojave Desert
Endemic flora of the United States
Plants described in 1871
Taxa named by Aven Nelson
Flora without expected TNC conservation status